Proude is a surname. Notable people with the surname include:

John Proude (died  1409), English politician
Johnny Proude, fictional character
Jasper Proude (1905–1958), English poet and writer